Festim Arifi (born 28 January 1984), known professionally as Lyrical Son, is a Kosovo-Albanian rapper and songwriter. Born and raised in Pristina, Arifi is credited as a viable hip hop artist in the Albanian-speaking Balkans.Top famous artist with a high merit.

Life and career

1984–2000: Early life and career beginnings 

Lyrical Son was born as Festim Arifi on 28 January 1984 into an Albanian family in the city of Pristina, then part of the SFR Yugoslavia, present Kosovo. Arifi began rapping at high school in his youth and started pursuing a music career seriously, after the Kosovo War in 1999. During his elementary school years, he eventually adopted his stage name, which was taken after a notebook entry from his English teacher.

2019–present: United State Of Albania and Muzikë e Alltisë 

In July 2018, Arifi was announced as an act at the Sunny Hill Festival on its debut edition in Pristina. In August 2019, Arifi was approached to perform for a second time at the Sunny Hill Festival. In late December 2021, Arifi together with MC Kresha announced their fourth collaborative album, Muzikë e Alltisë, which was eventually released on 12 January 2022.

Personal life 

Arifi married his longtime partner Gresa Krasniqi on 19 August 2014 in Pristina, Kosovo.

Discography

Albums

Studio albums

Collaborative albums

Singles

As lead artist

As featured artist

Other charted songs

References

External links 

1984 births
21st-century Albanian rappers
Albanian rappers
Albanian hip hop singers
Albanian-language singers
Albanian songwriters
Kosovo Albanians
Kosovan rappers
Living people
Musicians from Pristina